Ryan Matthew Neufeld (born November 22, 1975) is a former American football tight end in the National Football League for the Dallas Cowboys, Jacksonville Jaguars and Buffalo Bills. He also was a member of the Rhein Fire in NFL Europe, the Florida Tuskers and Omaha Nighthawks in the United Football League. He played college football at UCLA.

Early years
Neufeld attended Live Oak High School in Morgan Hill, California. As a junior, he received All-league and lineman of the year honors.

As a senior wide receiver, he registered 17 receptions for 633 yards, 7 touchdowns and received All-league honors. He finished his high school career with 45 receptions for 1,122 yards (24.9-yard average).

He also practiced track and basketball.

College career
Neufeld accepted a football scholarship from UCLA, where he was redshirted and converted into a linebacker. As a freshman backup outside linebacker, he had 23 tackles and 2 sacks. The next season, he made 16 tackles and missed 3 games with an ankle injury. He had 8 tackles against the University of Michigan.

As a junior, he was moved to tight end behind Mike Grieb. He tallied 4 receptions for 60 yards, one touchdown and was the starter at long snapper. As a senior, he posted 14 receptions (tied for fifth on the team), 141 yards and one touchdown. He finished his college career with 18 receptions for 201 yards, 2 touchdowns, 39 tackles and 2 sacks.

Professional career

Dallas Cowboys
Neufeld was signed as an undrafted free agent by the Dallas Cowboys after the 1999 NFL draft on April 30, with the intention of converting him into a fullback. He was waived on September 5 and signed to the practice squad on September 7. On October 27, he was promoted to the active roster to be used on special teams and as a backup fullback. In 6 games, he registered 6 special teams tackles. He was deactivated in 2 games with a right ankle injury. He had one kickoff return for 9 yards in the playoffs against the Minnesota Vikings.

In 2000, he was allocated to the Rhein Fire of the NFL Europe. He played as a tight end, making 8 receptions for 75 yards, one touchdown and contributing to the team winning World Bowl VIII. He was released on August 27.

Miami Dolphins
On August 30, 2000, he was signed by the Miami Dolphins' practice squad. He was cut one week later on September 5.

Jacksonville Jaguars
On September 12, 2000, he was signed by the Jacksonville Jaguars to the practice squad as a tight end. He was promoted to the roster on October 12. He was released on October 21 to make room for cornerback Shad Criss. He was re-signed on October 24. He appeared in 3 games, was declared inactive in 4 and dressed but did not play in 2 contests. He was a backup tight end and made one special teams tackle.

In 2001, he suffered through eye, finger and calf injuries that limited his playing time during training camp and was released on August 26.

Seattle Seahawks
In 2002, he was signed as a free agent by the Seattle Seahawks, but was cut before the start of the season, when the team decided to keep the 2 tight ends they drafted that year.

Buffalo Bills
In 2003, Neufeld was signed by the Buffalo Bills to be used as a backup fullback and tight end. His best statistical season came in 2004 as a backup tight end, when he registered 6 receptions for 61 yards.

On December 22, 2005, he was placed on the injured reserve list with a knee injury. On November 12, 2006, he suffered a serious tendon injury in his foot and was again placed on the injured reserve list on November 16. In 2007, he was declared inactive in 7 of the last 10 games. He wasn't re-signed at the end of the season.

Florida Tuskers (UFL)
Neufeld was signed by the Florida Tuskers of the United Football League on September 8, 2009. He missed several games after being injured and finished with 2 receptions for 6 yards and one touchdown.

Omaha Nighthawks (UFL)
In 2010, he was selected by the Omaha Nighthawks in the United Football League expansion draft. He suffered a torn PCL during training camp and was lost for the season.

Personal life
Neufeld is active in the Garth Brooks’ foundation Teammates for Kids and is the current director of football operations for the Miracle League of Frisco.

References

External links
Just Sports Stats
Real Talk: A Football Wife’s Take on Player Cuts

1975 births
Living people
People from Morgan Hill, California
Players of American football from California
American football tight ends
American football fullbacks
UCLA Bruins football players
Dallas Cowboys players
Rhein Fire players
Jacksonville Jaguars players
Seattle Seahawks players
Sportspeople from Santa Clara County, California
Buffalo Bills players
Florida Tuskers players
Omaha Nighthawks players